The urban agglomeration of Longueuil was created on January 1, 2006 as a result of the de-amalgamation process brought upon by the Charest government.  It encompasses all the boroughs that were merged into the previous city of Longueuil and still retains the same area as that mega-city.

The urban agglomeration of Longueuil is coextensive with the territory equivalent to a regional county municipality (TE) and census division (CD) of Longueuil, whose geographical code is 58.

In 2012, Longueuil mayor Caroline St-Hilaire proposed that the Urban agglomeration of Longueuil leave the Montérégie and become its own administrative region.

History
Longueuil merged on January 1, 2002 with the communities of Boucherville, Brossard, Greenfield Park, LeMoyne, Saint-Bruno-de-Montarville, Saint-Hubert, and Saint-Lambert. These cities became boroughs of the Longueuil megacity. Saint-Lambert and LeMoyne combined to become one borough called Saint-Lambert/LeMoyne. The former city of Longueuil was renamed Le Vieux-Longueuil borough.

The former city hall of Brossard, became the city hall for the new city of Longueuil.

On June 20, 2004, the former boroughs of Boucherville, Brossard, Saint-Bruno-de-Montarville and Saint-Lambert voted to demerge from Longueuil to reconstitute themselves as municipalities on January 1, 2006. The rest of the city stayed intact.

The departure of Saint-Lambert from the city of Longueuil resulted in the immediate disbanding of the Saint-Lambert/LeMoyne borough. LeMoyne's small population and territory did not allow it to become a borough of its own. In 2005, the population of LeMoyne was given the choice to pick a new borough between Le Vieux-Longueuil, Saint-Hubert and Greenfield Park. Le Vieux-Longueuil ended up being the winner and amalgamated LeMoyne into its borough on January 1, 2006.

Following the demergers, Longueuil relocated its city hall from Brossard to Saint-Hubert, where it is still located.

Structure
According to the Act respecting the exercise of certain municipal powers in certain urban agglomerations, the cities and boroughs of the urban agglomeration of Longueuil are structured as follows:

Central municipality
Ville de Longueuil
Borough of Le Vieux-Longueuil
Borough of Greenfield Park
Borough of Saint-Hubert

Related municipalities
Ville de Boucherville
Ville de Brossard
Ville de Saint-Bruno-de-Montarville
Ville de Saint-Lambert

Population and representation by district

Agglomeration powers

Under this new system of municipal organization, the agglomeration city and the reconstituted cities (in this case, Boucherville, Brossard, Saint-Bruno-de-Montarville and Saint-Lambert) share powers and responsibilities.  The urban agglomeration is headed by an agglomeration council which exercises these agglomeration powers.

Demographics

Language

Mother tongue from 2016 Canadian Census

Transportation

Access Routes
Highways and numbered routes that run through the municipality, including external routes that start or finish at the county border:

Autoroutes

Principal Highways

Secondary Highways:
None

External Routes:
None

See also
 Longueuil City Council
 Municipal reorganization in Quebec
 Urban agglomerations of Quebec
 Longueuil
 List of mayors of Longueuil
 Boroughs of Longueuil
 List of regional county municipalities and equivalent territories in Quebec

References

External links
 Bill 6 (An Act to amend various legislative provisions respecting municipal affairs) as applied to the Ville de Longueuil
 Reconstituted municipalities 
 CRÉ 

 
Quebec populated places on the Saint Lawrence River
Longueuil
Longueuil
Montérégie
Longueuil
 Longueuil